Justine Henin was the defending champion, and did not compete this year.

Amanda Coetzer won the title by defeating Cristina Torrens Valero 4–6, 6–2, 6–3 in the final.

Seeds

Draw

Finals

Top half

Bottom half

References

External links
 Official results archive (ITF)
 Official results archive (WTA)

Belgian Open (tennis)
Mexx Benelux Open